Leo O'Reilly (born 10 April 1944), D.D., is the emeritus Bishop of the Roman Catholic Diocese of Kilmore. He was installed as Bishop of Kilmore on 15 November 1998 and retired on health grounds in December 2018.

Early life 

A native of Kill, County Cavan, he was ordained a priest in 1969. Before being appointed Bishop he served as the parish priest of Castletara (Ballyhaise), a post in which he succeeded Seán Brady, his second cousin, who later became Cardinal Archbishop of Armagh.

The family later moved to Kilconny, Belturbet. He received his early education in Drumnatrade and Tullyvin National Schools and later in St. Patrick's College, Cavan. He studied for the priesthood in Maynooth College and was ordained in 1969.

He was a member of the staff in St Patrick's College until 1976 when he went to Rome to do further studies. He served on the staff of the Pontifical Irish College from 1978 until 1980. In 1981 he gained his a doctorate in theology from the Pontifical Gregorian University and that summer was appointed chaplain to Bailieboro Community School.

Child Protection Success

In a report published by the National Board for Safeguarding Children in the Catholic Church on 30 November 2011 Kilmore was said to be a "model of best practice" in child protection, mainly due to the "personal commitment and diligence" of Bishop Leo O’Reilly, a review into safeguarding children has found. Allegations against seven priests received since 1975 were identified by the board for the Review of Safeguarding Children in the Catholic Church in the Kilmore diocese. There were no cases of a failure to report or address matters when they came to light and all the allegations were reported to the Garda and the Health Service Executive (or health boards), the review found. There were no examples of "poor practice" since Bishop O’Reilly was appointed in 1998. The board praised the bishop's approach as an "excellent example" for others to follow.

However, a priest at the centre of abuse allegations and complaints continued to live in a parochial house in the Kilmore Diocese despite repeated requests from Bishop O'Reilly that he move to alternative accommodation.

Abortion

Responding to the Irish Government's decision to introduce legislation and regulations on the abortion issue, Bishop O'Reilly declared it the "first step on the road to a culture of death", echoing a phrase popularised by Pope John Paul II on a World Youth Day tour of the United States in 1993

View on same-sex marriage

In relation to the Irish government's Constitutional Convention to consider same-sex marriage, Bishop O'Reilly questioned the length of time available and also stated that any legislation of same-sex marriage would see that the "roles of mother and father are to be consigned to history"

References

External links
Career Timeline

1944 births
Living people
20th-century Roman Catholic bishops in Ireland
21st-century Roman Catholic bishops in Ireland
Roman Catholic bishops of Kilmore
Pontifical Gregorian University alumni
Alumni of St Patrick's College, Maynooth
People educated at St Patrick's College, Cavan